Xenozancla is a monotypic moth genus in the family Geometridae. Its only species, Xenozancla versicolor, is found in northern India. Both the genus and species were first described by William Warren in 1893.

References

Moths described in 1893
Geometrinae
Monotypic moth genera